The Hills is an American reality television series that originally aired on MTV from May 31, 2006 until July 13, 2010. Developed as the spin-off of Laguna Beach: The Real Orange County, the series aired six seasons and focused on the personal and professional lives of several young women residing in Los Angeles, California. Its premise was originated with Adam DiVello, while Liz Gateley served as the executive producer.

Throughout its run, the series was generally led by four primary cast members (three in season 5), who were credited by their first names. Their storylines were largely developed by a number of supporting cast members. It originally focused on Lauren Conrad, who appeared in its predecessor, as she pursued a career in the fashion industry. It additionally placed emphasis on her housemate Heidi Montag and their friends Audrina Patridge and Whitney Port. Conrad's friend Lo Bosworth and Montag's boyfriend Spencer Pratt developed major positions as part of the supporting cast in the second season, while his sister Stephanie Pratt was added in the third. After moving to New York City, Port left the series upon the conclusion of the fourth season to launch her own spin-off The City.

Looking to pursue other career opportunities, Conrad left the series halfway through the fifth season, and was subsequently replaced by fellow Laguna Beach: The Real Orange County cast member Kristin Cavallari. Bosworth and the female Pratt joined Cavallari and Patridge as primary cast members in the sixth and final season, while Montag and her husband Pratt were removed from the show after four episodes.

Main cast members
  Main cast (appears in opening credits) 
  Supporting cast (3+ episodes)
  Guest cast (1–2 episodes)

Cast notes

Supporting cast members
  Supporting cast (3+ episodes)
  Guest cast (1–2 episodes)

Cast notes

Cast crossovers
The Hills franchise includes its predecessor, Laguna Beach: The Real Orange County, and its spin-offs Newport Harbor, The City and The Hills: New Beginnings. Several cast members have appeared on multiple shows.

  Main cast (receives star billing at some point in the series) 
  Supporting cast (3+ episodes)
  Guest cast (1–2 episodes)

References

The Hills (TV series)
Hills
Participants in American reality television series